William J. Spencer was an American silent film actor. Spencer starred in 14 films between 1915 and 1921.

He starred in films such as The Twinkler in 1916.

Filmography
The Legend of the Poisoned Pool (1915) (as William J. Spencer)
The Honor of the District Attorney (1915)
To Melody a Soul Responds (1915)
The Twinkler (1916)
The Return of James Jerome (1916) (as William J. Spencer)
A Sister to Cain (1916) (as W.J. Spencer)
The Gulf Between (1916/I) (as W.J. Spencer)
The Redemption of Helene (1916) (as William J. Spencer)
A Reformation Delayed (1916) (as William J. Spencer)
Two News Items (1916)
The Law's Injustice (1916) (as William J. Spencer)
The Lost Bracelet (1916) (as William J. Spencer)
Peggy Leads the Way (1917) Pop Hicks
High Gear Jeffrey (1921)

External links

Year of birth missing
Year of death missing
American male silent film actors
20th-century American male actors